The Game Warden is a 1913 American short silent film romantic comedy. The film starred Earle Foxe, Irene Boyle, and Stuart Holmes.

External links

American silent short films
1910s romantic comedy films
1913 films
American black-and-white films
Kalem Company films
American romantic comedy films
1913 short films
1913 comedy films
1910s American films
Silent romantic comedy films
Silent American comedy films